Joseph William Woodrough (August 29, 1873 – October 2, 1977) was a United States circuit judge of the United States Court of Appeals for the Eighth Circuit and previously was a United States district judge of the United States District Court for the District of Nebraska.

Education and career

Born on August 29, 1873, in Cincinnati, Ohio, Woodrough studied at Heidelberg University in the German Empire and then read law in 1893. He was a Judge of the Ward County Court in Texas from 1894 to 1896. He was the County Attorney of Ward County in 1897. He was in private practice in Omaha, Nebraska from 1898 to 1916.

Federal judicial service

Woodrough was nominated by President Woodrow Wilson on March 13, 1916, to a seat on the United States District Court for the District of Nebraska vacated by Judge William Henry Munger. He was confirmed by the United States Senate on March 31, 1916, and received his commission on April 3, 1916. His service terminated on April 12, 1933, due to his elevation to the Eighth Circuit.

Woodrough was nominated by President Franklin D. Roosevelt on April 3, 1933, to a seat on the United States Court of Appeals for the Eighth Circuit vacated by Judge Arba Seymour Van Valkenburg. He was confirmed by the Senate on April 12, 1933, and received his commission on April 12, 1933. He assumed senior status on January 3, 1961. His service terminated on October 2, 1977, due to his death.

See also
 Wesley E. Brown
 List of United States federal judges by longevity of service

References

Sources
 

1873 births
1977 deaths
American centenarians
Men centenarians
Texas state court judges
Judges of the United States District Court for the District of Nebraska
United States district court judges appointed by Woodrow Wilson
Judges of the United States Court of Appeals for the Eighth Circuit
United States court of appeals judges appointed by Franklin D. Roosevelt
20th-century American judges
United States federal judges admitted to the practice of law by reading law
People from Cincinnati